Tarik Ramić (born 7 April 2003) is a Bosnian professional footballer who plays as an attacking midfielder for Bosnian Premier League club Sarajevo and the Bosnia and Herzegovina U19 national team.

Honours
Sarajevo 
Bosnian Cup: 2020–21

References

External links

2003 births
Living people
People from Sanski Most
Association football midfielders
Bosnia and Herzegovina footballers
Bosnia and Herzegovina youth international footballers
FK Sarajevo players